Steve Lutz (born October 25, 1972) is the current head men's college basketball coach for Western Kentucky.

Early life
Lutz grew up in San Antonio, Texas and played basketball and baseball for East Central High School. He then played one season of basketball at Ranger Junior College before arriving at Texas Lutheran.

Coaching career

Early coaching career
Lutz started his coaching career with stops at University of Incarnate Word and Garden City CC (Kansas). During his four seasons at UIW, the Crusaders (now Cardinals) went 99-20.

Stephen F. Austin

SMU
Lutz spent six seasons at SMU (2006-2010) under coach Matt Doherty

Creighton
Lutz spent seven seasons at Creighton (2010-2017) under coach Greg McDermott.

Purdue 
Lutz spent four seasons as an assistant coach at Purdue (2017-2021). In 2020-21 Lutz coached Jaden Ivey prior to Ivey's #5 overall draft pick in the 2022 NBA draft. Lutz was the Boilermakers' defensive guru working with head coach Matt Painter.

Texas A&M Corpus Christi
Lutz spent two seasons as a head coach at Texas A&M-Corpus Christi (2021-2023). Turning the program around, Lutz finished with a 47-23 record (67.1% Win Rate) during the two years as Head Coach. Lutz also lead the Islanders to a Southland Conference Regular Season Champions, 2x Southland Conference Tournament Champions, and the programs first ever 2023 NCAA Division I men's basketball tournament victory against Southeast Missouri State Redhawks men's basketball.

Western Kentucky
On March 18, 2023, Lutz was announced as the new head coach at Western Kentucky.

Head coaching record

Personal life
Lutz and his wife, Shannon, have two daughters and a son.

References

Living people
1972 births
American men's basketball coaches
Incarnate Word Cardinals men's basketball coaches
Stephen F. Austin Lumberjacks basketball coaches
SMU Mustangs men's basketball coaches
Creighton Bluejays men's basketball coaches
Purdue Boilermakers men's basketball coaches
Texas A&M–Corpus Christi Islanders men's basketball coaches
Texas Lutheran University alumni
Western Kentucky Hilltoppers basketball coaches